Slaheddine Cherif (10 September 1937– 6 January 2023) was a Tunisian government official.

Biography
Born in Tunis on 10 September 1937, Cherif studied law and criminology at the Tunis El Manar University and later at the Faculty of Law of Paris.

After serving in various other government roles, he became director-general of the Ministry of Foreign Affairs in 1988.

On 11 October 1991, Prime Minister Hamed Karoui named him . On 17 November 1999, he became Secretary-General of the Presidency of the Republic of Tunisia under Zine El Abidine Ben Ali.

Cherif died on 6 January 2023, at the age of 85. He was buried in the Jellaz Cemetery.

References

1937 births
2023 deaths
20th-century Tunisian politicians
21st-century Tunisian politicians
University of Paris alumni
Tunis El Manar University alumni
People from Tunis
Tunisian judges